4'Cl-CUMYL-PINACA (also known as SGT-157) is an indazole-3-carboxamide based synthetic cannabinoid compound, first disclosed in a 2014 patent. It has been sold as a designer drug, first reported in 2020 alongside two similar compounds 4'F-CUMYL-5F-PICA (SGT-64) and 4'F-CUMYL-5F-PINACA (SGT-65), and the metabolism of these compounds has been studied to assist with their identification in forensic casework.

See also 
 5F-CUMYL-PINACA
 CUMYL-FUBINACA
 CUMYL-PINACA

References 

Cannabinoids
Designer drugs
Indazolecarboxamides
Chloroarenes